Henry Robinson Luce (April 3, 1898 – February 28, 1967) was an American magazine magnate who founded Time, Life, Fortune, and Sports Illustrated magazines. He has been called "the most influential private citizen in the America of his day".

Born in Shandong, China, to Presbyterian parents, Luce moved to the US at the age of 15 and later attended Yale College. He launched and closely supervised a stable of magazines that transformed journalism and the reading habits of millions of Americans. Time summarized and interpreted the week's news; Life was a picture magazine of politics, culture, and society that dominated American visual perceptions in the era before television; Fortune reported on national and international business; and Sports Illustrated explored the world of sports. Counting his radio projects and newsreels, Luce created the first multimedia corporation. He envisaged that the United States would achieve world hegemony, and in 1941 he declared the 20th century would be the "American Century".

Early life
Luce was born in Tengchow (now Penglai), Shandong, China, on April 3, 1898, the son of Elizabeth Root Luce and Henry Winters Luce, who was a Presbyterian missionary.

Education
At 15, he was sent to the US to attend the Hotchkiss School in Connecticut, where he tried hard to overcome his stuttering.  As a scholarship student he was isolated from the upper-class boys. He was subsidized by an elderly Chicago heiress, Nancy Fowler McCormick, who favored sons of missionaries.  Applying himself to study, Luce quickly became the top student. He was especially strong in languages—he studied Greek, Latin, French and German—and already knew Chinese. He edited the Hotchkiss Literary Monthly. There, he first met Briton Hadden; they became best friends.

Hotchkiss was a feeder prep school for Yale. After a summer working on a  Springfield newspaper, Luce matriculated in New Haven in fall 1916. He was the top freshman academically, but grades did not confer as much prestige as a staff role on the Yale Daily News. Only four freshmen were chosen by the News; they included Luce and Hadden. When the U.S. entered the World War in 1917, a third of the students joined the army; the rest including Luce, joined ROTC and attended class in uniform.  Luce also joined Alpha Delta, a minor fraternity. His grades remained top-level, and every spare hour was devoted to newspaper work.   Luce and Hadden were the two outstanding journalists; when the vote came in January 1918 for chairmanship of the News Hadden beat Luce by one vote. Luce instead became managing editor and the two worked closely together and started planning their future.  Meanwhile, the Army assigned them as ROTC leaders to train new recruits.  The war ended before either was commissioned. They returned to campus in January 1919 as juniors. In May they were both tapped for the highly prestigious secret society Skull and Bones. He tried but failed to get a Rhodes scholarship to Oxford, but he was admitted and paid his way. He spent the year travelling Europe, observing the postwar scene closely. He returned to the United States to take a newspaper job in Chicago as a junior reporter.

Magazines
Nightly discussions of the concept of a news magazine led Luce and Hadden, both age 23, to quit their jobs in 1922. Later that same year, they partnered with Robert Livingston Johnson and another Yale classmate to form Time Inc.

Luce, supported by Editor-in-Chief T. S. Matthews, appointed Whittaker Chambers as acting Foreign News editor in 1944, despite the feuds that Chambers had with reporters in the field.

Luce, who remained editor-in-chief of all his publications until 1964, maintained a position as an influential member of the Republican Party. An instrumental figure behind the so-called "China Lobby", he played a large role in steering American foreign policy and popular sentiment in favor of Kuomintang leader Chiang Kai-shek and his wife, Soong Mei-ling, in their war against the Japanese. (The Chiangs appeared in the cover of Time eleven times between 1927 and 1955.)

Luce penned a famous editorial in Life magazine in 1941, called "The American Century", which defined the role of U.S. foreign policy for the remainder of the 20th century (and perhaps beyond).

He died in Phoenix, Arizona in 1967. At his death, he was said to be worth $100 million in Time Inc. stock. Most of his fortune went to the Henry Luce Foundation, where his son Henry III served as chairman and chief executive for many years.

Family

Luce met his first wife, Lila Hotz, while he was studying at Yale in 1919. They married in 1923 and had two children, Peter Paul and Henry Luce III, before divorcing in 1935. In 1935 he married his second wife, Clare Boothe Luce, who had an 11-year-old daughter, Ann Clare Brokaw, whom he raised as his own. He died in Phoenix, Arizona in 1967. At his death, he was said to be worth $100 million in Time Inc. stock. Most of his fortune went to the Henry Luce Foundation, where his son Henry III served as chairman and chief executive for many years.

Recognition
He was honored by the United States Postal Service with a 32¢ Great Americans series (1980–2000) postage stamp. Luce was inducted into the Junior Achievement U.S. Business Hall of Fame.

References

Further reading
 Baughman, James L. "Henry R. Luce and the Business of Journalism." Business & Economic History On-Line 9 (2011). online
 Baughman, James L. Henry R. Luce and the Rise of the American News Media (2001) online
 Brinkley, Alan. The Publisher: Henry Luce and His American Century, (Alfred A. Knopf, 2010) 531 pp. online
 "A Magazine Master Builder" Book review by Janet Maslin, The New York Times, April 19, 2010
 Brinkley, Alan. What Would Henry Luce Make of the Digital Age?, Time (April 19, 2010) excerpt and text search
 Elson, Robert T. Time Inc: The Intimate History of a Publishing Enterprise, 1923–1941 (1968); vol. 2: The World of Time Inc.: The Intimate History, 1941–1960 (1973), official corporate history. vol 1 online also vol 2 online
 Herzstein, Robert E.  Henry R. Luce, Time, and the American Crusade in Asia (2006) online
 Herzstein, Robert E. Henry R. Luce: A Political Portrait of the Man Who Created the American Century (1994). online
 Morris, Sylvia Jukes. Rage for Fame: The Ascent of Clare Boothe Luce (1997).
 Swanberg, W. A., Luce and His Empire, Charles Scribner's Sons, New York, 1972.
 Wilner, Isaiah. The Man Time Forgot: A Tale of Genius, Betrayal, and the Creation of Time Magazine (HarperCollins, 2006).

Primary sources
Luce, Henry. The ideas of Henry Luce ed by John Knox Jessup, (1969) online

External links

 John Foster Dulles and Clare Boothe Luce link (pdf format)
 TIME biography
 The Henry Luce Foundation
 Luce Center for American Art at the Brooklyn Museum – Visible Storage and Study Center
 Whitman, Alden. "Henry R. Luce, Creator of Time–Life Magazine Empire, Dies in Phoenix at 68", The New York Times, March 1, 1967.
 PBS American Masters
 
 Henry R. Luce Papers at the New-York Historical Society

1898 births
1967 deaths
Alumni of the University of Oxford
American anti-communists
American magazine founders
American magazine publishers (people)
American mass media owners
American Presbyterians
Businesspeople from Yantai
Children of American missionaries in China
Connecticut Republicans
Hotchkiss School alumni
New Right (United States)
People from Penglai, Shandong
People from Ridgefield, Connecticut
Skull and Bones Society
Time (magazine) people
Yale University alumni